Foxbury is an area in the London Borough of Bromley, located to the east of Chislehurst. It is home to the Grade II-listed Foxbury Manor, several educational institutes and a number of sports and athletic grounds.

References

Districts of the London Borough of Bromley
Chislehurst